Ekaterina Sergeevna Andreeva (born 27 November 1961 or 1965) is a Russian journalist, actress and anchor of Vremya and Novosti, Channel One Russia's main evening news bulletins since 1997.

Biography 
Her father was a deputy chairman of the Gossnab of USSR, and her mother was a housewife. Ekaterina Andreeva has a younger sister, Svetlana. As a child, she had interest in basketball, and briefly studied at the School of Olympic Reserve.

In 1990, she entered the All-union training courses for radio and television broadcasters (with the USSR Radio and Television). She studied with Igor Kirillov.

In 1991, Andreeva began working in television. It was announcer Central Television and broadcasting company Ostankino, leading the program Good morning.  Since 1995, in the TV Company ORT: information program editor, presenter of the program Novosti.

She was awarded the Order of Friendship in 2006 and was awarded TEFI in 2007.

In 2010, she was listed in the top 10 of Russian TV presenters.

In August 2014, Ukraine included Andreeva in the sanctions list due to her position on the war in the east of Ukraine and the annexation of Crimea by Russia.

In October 2020, during the COVID-19 pandemic in Russia, Andreeva drew backlash after she supported the anti-mask movement.

On 14 March 2022, while reporting live on television, her colleague Marina Ovsyannikova held up a sign behind her as protest against the Russian invasion of Ukraine in which both of them received worldwide attention.

References

External links
 
 Радиостанция «Эхо Москвы» / Андреева Екатерина
 Лица Первого Канала: Екатерина Андреева

1961 births
Living people
Russian television presenters
Radio and television announcers
Journalists from Moscow
Russian women journalists
Russian actresses
Actresses from Moscow
Russian women television presenters
Kutafin Moscow State Law University alumni